The Urka is a river of Kaunas County, central Lithuania. It is a left tributary of the Barupė.

The Urka river starts in the Bitvanas Forest, in Kaunas District Municipality. It flows towards north western direction through Kaunas District Municipality and Kėdainiai District Municipality, then empties into the Barupė river next to Labūnava village.

Karaliūnai, Butkūnai, Užumiškiai, Kačergiai, Pakapiai, Labūnava villages and Vandžiogala town are located on the shores of the Urka. A small pond is dammed on the Urka nearby its mouth.

The hydronym is of uncertain origin. One version is that it derives from Lithuanian verb urkioti ('to scold, to wig'), another version that it could be of Finno-Ugric background (as  'rivulet').

References

Rivers of Lithuania
Kėdainiai District Municipality
Kaunas District Municipality